The 1994 United States Senate election in California was held November 8, 1994. Incumbent Democratic U.S. Senator Dianne Feinstein won re-election to her first full term. By a margin of 1.9%, this election was the closest race of the 1994 Senate election cycle.

Democratic primary

Candidates
Ted J. Andromedas
Dianne Feinstein, incumbent Senator since 1992
Daniel O'Dowd, founder and president of Green Hills Software

Results

Republican primary

Candidates
John M. Brown
Wolf G. Dalichau
William E. Dannemeyer, former U.S. Representative from Fullerton and candidate for Senate in 1992
Michael Huffington, U.S. Representative from Santa Barbara
Kate Squires

Results

Other nominations

Peace & Freedom Party

Libertarian Party

American Independent Party

Green Party 
While there was no primary election for the Green Party, Barbara Blong got the nomination of the party and represented them in the general election.

General election

Candidates 
 Dianne Feinstein (D), incumbent U.S. Senator
 Michael Huffington (R), U.S. Representative
 Elizabeth Cervantes Barron (PF)
 Barbara Blong (G)
 Richard Benjamin Boddie (L)
 Paul Meeuwenberg (AI)

Campaign 
After one term in the House representing Santa Barbara and San Luis Obispo counties, Huffington spent $8 million by the end of August and a total of $28 million during the entire campaign. He became wealthy off oil and gas. The race saw personal attacks on Huffington's wife, Arianna Huffington, who was very involved in the race (the media dubbed her the "Sir Edmund Hillary of social climbing," according to The Almanac of American Politics).

Huffington was called a hypocrite for supporting Proposition 187 and then breaking the law for employing illegal aliens, a story which came out in the race's final days. A grand total of $44 million was spent in the election. At the time, it was the most expensive campaign in a non-presidential election in American history. Chris Cillizza of The Washington Post named the election one of the nastiest senate elections in modern history.

Results 
On election day it was a very close race, but Feinstein won Los Angeles County, which may have pulled her ahead. Her sizable win in the nine-county San Francisco Bay Area may also be credited to her slim statewide victory. A large number of absentee ballots left the results in doubt for over two weeks. On November 18, Senator Feinstein declared victory. At that time, she was ahead by 147,404 votes, with only 156,210 remaining uncounted ballots. Huffington had not conceded at that point, saying that there was evidence of voter fraud and calling for an investigation. He had already filed a legal complaint, which had already been dismissed. As of December 23, Huffington still contended that there may have been voting fraud and had not conceded.

Overall

By county 
Final results from the Secretary of State.

See also 
 1994 United States Senate elections

References

External links 
 JoinCalifornia 1994 General Election

1994
California
1994 California elections